The Pitchfork Music Festival 2021 was held on September 10 to 12, 2021 at the Union Park, Chicago, United States. The festival was headlined by Erykah Badu, Phoebe Bridgers and St. Vincent. Indie rock band The Fiery Furnaces made their first concert in over ten years during the festival.

Lineup
Headline performers are listed in boldface. Artists listed from latest to earliest set times.

Notes

References

Further reading

External links

2021 music festivals
Pitchfork Music Festival